Kurakhivka is an urban-type settlement in the Pokrovsk Raion, Donetsk Oblast (province) of eastern Ukraine.   The population is

Demographics
Native language as of the Ukrainian Census of 2001:
 Ukrainian 30.56%
 Russian 69.05%
 Armenian 0.17%
 Belarusian 0.07%
 Moldovan (Romanian) 0.05%
 Hungarian and Greek 0.02%

References

Urban-type settlements in Pokrovsk Raion